Casares may refer to:

Places
 Casares, Málaga, a town and municipality in Andalusia, Spain
Casares, Asturias, a parish in the Principality of Asturias, Spain
Casares de las Hurdes, a municipality in Extremadura, Spain
Vicente Casares, a village in Buenos Aires province, Argentina

Other uses
Casares (surname)